The 1938 United States Senate election in Ohio took place on November 7, 1938. Incumbent Senator Robert J. Bulkley ran for re-election to a second full term in office, but was defeated by the Republican nominee, former state Senator Robert A. Taft, the elder son of former President and supreme court chief justice William Howard Taft. Taft's victory was a part of a major Republican wave nationally, where Republicans gained 8 Senate seats and 81 seats in the House of Representatives, which was largely attributable to incumbent Democratic President Franklin Roosevelts's unpopularity in the aftermath of the Recession of 1937–1938 and the President's controversial plan to add more seats to the Supreme Court, which he proposed after the court ruled some of his New Deal programs unconstitutional. Taft's victory marked the beginning of 4 consecutive Republican victories in this seat, and Democrats would not win it again until Governor Frank Lausche won it in 1956.

General election

Candidates
Robert J. Bulkley, incumbent Senator since 1930 (Democratic)
Robert A. Taft, former State Senator from Cincinnati and Speaker of the Ohio House of Representatives (Republican)

Results

See also 
 1938 United States Senate elections

References

1938
Ohio
United States Senate